The 2022–23 Czech National Football League (known as the Fortuna národní liga for sponsorship reasons) is the 30th season of the Czech Republic's second tier football league. The season started on 29 July 2022.

The season format is unchanged from last season, each team will play in the league format home and away matches. The top-ranked team will we promoted to the Czech First League, the two teams positioned 2nd and 3rd will play a play-out with two teams from the first league positioned 14th and 15th in a home and away format. The two lowest-ranked teams will be relegated directly to the third tier.

Team changes

From FNL
FC Zbrojovka Brno (promoted to 2022–23 Czech First League)
FK Ústí nad Labem (relegated to Bohemian Football League)
FK Viktoria Žižkov (relegated to Bohemian Football League)

To FNL
MFK Karviná (relegated from 2021–22 Czech First League)
SK Slavia Prague B (promoted from 2021–22 Bohemian Football League)
SK Sigma Olomouc B (promoted from 2021–22 Moravian-Silesian Football League)

Team overview

Locations and stadiums
The home stadium of MFK Vyškov was not certified by the league to host matches. The club opted to play their home league matches for the season at Sportovní areál Drnovice in Drnovice.

League table

References

External links

Czech National Football League
2
Czech National Football League seasons
Czech Republic
Current association football seasons